Jacques Arthur DesBaillets (1910–1990) was a French Canadian radio and television personality. He is considered an important figure in the early development of the two mass media in Quebec.

Biography

Early life 

DesBaillets was the son of distinguished civil engineer and Swiss émigré Charles-Jules DesBaillets. His mother, was a French Canadian named Eugénie Lefevre. He was raised in Montreal in the city's most affluent neighbourhood and had a comfortable middle class upbringing. He attended Lower Canada College as a teenager and later attended McGill University where he joined the student theatre company.

Career 

After university DesBaillets was hired by CKVL to co-host a radio show with Jacques Normand, called La parade de la chansonnette française and consisting mainly of pop songs from France.

During the war years (1941–1943), he worked as a foreign correspondent for Radio Canada (French Canada's public broadcaster) based in London where he witnessed first hand the carnage of the Blitz. His assignments included interviewing Canadian forces stationed in England, particularly the French Canadian regiments Les Fusiliers de Montréal and the Vandoos, and filing reports on the war for listeners back home.   After the war, he met his wife  Joan McCort, where they were both working for the CBC (English Canada's public broadcaster) in the International Radio Service.

In 1949, DesBaillets was offered the position of host with CKVL radio station in Montreal by the station's owner Jack Tietolman. The show was broadcast between 7–9 in the morning and was called Bonjours messieurs dames.

His first TV show was called Télé-Metro. This was a TV talk show (inspired by the Jack Paar Show) broadcast live on Canal 10 and consisted of sketch comedy, as well as interviews with celebrities, politicians and famous actors.  His main co-stars over the years were Roger Baulu, Jean Coutu, Claude Séguin and Mario Verdon. The show was the first of its kind and was a brilliant success finally being cancelled after seven years on the air.

DesBaillets also worked as a sports journalist for a few years, acting as host of Radio-Canada's Hot Stove League program which was broadcast during hockey matches and involved a panel of experts discussing the game.

Later in life he pursued a career as an actor but was only able to find work doing small parts in movies and commercials. He also did work for the National Film Board of Canada, as a narrator of both French and English films.

Private life 

He dabbled in various business ventures during his life often with mixed results. Including a wine importing business and owning a chain of barbershops in Montreal.

DesBaillets' marriage to Joan McCort was to last until his death in his modest appartement located a 45 Brittany Apt 502 on September 4, 1990, caused by heart failure. It produced two sons: Charles and Robert DesBaillets. His grandson is Paul Desbaillets, Canadian restaurateur and media personality. DesBaillets was buried next to his parents in Mount Royal Cemetery in Montreal.

Filmography 
 Le cas Labrecque  - 1956
 Let's Talk About Love (Parlez-nous d'amour) - 1976 
 Keeping Track - 1985

References

External links

1910 births
1990 deaths
Canadian male journalists
Canadian people of Swiss-French descent
Canadian television personalities
Journalists from Montreal
Television personalities from Montreal
Burials at Mount Royal Cemetery